Baurisol is a village in Simlapal, Bankura, West Bengal, India.

About the village 

 A big pond named Baurisole Boro Bandh is situated in the village.

Population of the village 
In 2011 census, the population of the village is 685.

Education 
There is a Primary School named, Baurisole Primary School is situated in the village. The primary school was founded in 1955. The literacy rate of the village is 95%.

History 
The village was founded by two Utkala Brahmin, Ajodhyaram Pain and Bajjuram Pain. The area was ruled by Vallaidia's Zamindar. Gangadhar Pain bought 600 bigha Forest Land and 100 bigha Land. Nityananda Pain was the first Morhol of the village. He was given Morhol title (Bengali: মোড়ল উপাধি) and 75 bigha land by the Vallaidia's Zamindar. Later Ishan Pain became the Morhol of the village. This village's history is glorious for the villagers.

Geography 

This village is agriculturally dependent. It is situated between 22° 59’ 32" north latitude and between 87° 03' 27" east longitude. Baurisole Boro Bandh is very important for the irrigation system in agriculture. The village is beautiful for natural beauty.

References 

Villages in Bankura district
Geography of West Bengal